Milyeringa veritas (commonly known as the blind gudgeon) is a species of fish in the family Milyeringidae. It is endemic to groundwater and anchialine systems in caves in the Cape Range, Australia. Like other cave-adapted fish, the blind gudgeon is entirely blind and lacks pigmentation, using sensory papillae on its head and body to move around and find food. It has a reduced number of scales on its body and the head is almost scaleless. It is listed as vulnerable under the Australian Environment Protection and Biodiversity Conservation Act 1999. It is an omnivorous species which feeds on feeds on algae and possibly also detritus, as well as invertebrates. Invertebrates consumed by M. veritas include Stygiocaris sp., aquatic insect larvae such as those of caddis flies and non aquatic invertebrates which accidentally fall into the water such as isopods, ants and cockroaches. When the gut contents have been sampled 10% of the identifiable gut contents were Stygiocaris and 70% were terrestrial species, despite this species being restricted to caves. They are often observed hanging still in the water column or resting on ledges in the cave walls, behaviours which they also display when kept in aquaria, but can move quickly to avoid capture if threatened, for example when catching them with a net is attempted.

References

Milyeringa
Vulnerable fauna of Australia
Fish described in 1945
Taxonomy articles created by Polbot
Cave fish